Chow Yun-fat  (born 18 May 1955), previously known as Donald Chow, is a Hong Kong actor. He is perhaps best known for his collaborations with filmmaker John Woo in the five Hong Kong action heroic bloodshed films: A Better Tomorrow, A Better Tomorrow II, The Killer, Once a Thief and Hard Boiled, and in the West for his roles as Li Mu-bai in Crouching Tiger, Hidden Dragon and Sao Feng in Pirates of the Caribbean: At World's End. He mainly plays in drama films and has won three Hong Kong Film Awards for Best Actor and two Golden Horse Awards for Best Actor in Taiwan. Chow started his career in movies in 1976 with Goldig Films, the third largest film company at the time.

Early life and education
Chow was born in Lamma Island, Hong Kong, to Chow Yung-wan, who worked on a Shell Oil Company tanker, and Chan Lai-fong, who was a cleaning lady and vegetable farmer. Chow grew up in a farming community on Lamma Island, in a house with no electricity. He woke up at dawn each morning to help his mother sell herbal jelly and Hakka tea-pudding (客家茶粿) on the streets; in the afternoons, he went to work in the fields. His family moved to Kowloon when he was ten.

At 17, Chow left school to help support the family by doing odd jobs including a bellboy, postman, camera salesman, and taxi driver.

Chow's life started to change after college when he responded to a newspaper advertisement, and his actor-trainee application was accepted by TVB, the local television station. He signed a three-year contract with the studio and made his acting debut. Chow became a heartthrob and familiar face in soap operas that were exported internationally. According to his filmography, Chow made his debut in 1976 in various movies produced by Goldig Films, including Hot Blood (入冊).  Goldig Films was founded and self-funded by Gouw Hiap Kian who was its Chairman and Managing Director and employed other individuals as movie directors. It produced and distributed over 100 movies from 1972 to 1982. Goldig also invested in properties, including a cinema, and financial investments with substantial assets since  the 1990s. Chow was identified by Goldig to be an actor before he applied to TVB as a trainee.

Career
Chow's first film contract was an exclusive acting contract with Goldig Films (note page 3). Chow appeared in the 1980 TV series The Bund on TVB. The series, about the rise and fall of a gangster in 1930s Shanghai, was a hit throughout Asia and made Chow a star.

Although Chow continued his TV success, his goal was to become a film actor. However, his occasional ventures into low-budget films in the 1980s after ones by Goldig were disastrous. Most of Chow's movies produced by Goldig Films under exclusive contract in the 1970s achieved high gross revenues of over HK$ 1m per movie. These figures are higher than ones Chow acted in the early 1980s, including Modern Heroes (江湖檔案), Soul Ash (灰靈), The Bund (上海灘), The Bund Part 2(上海灘續集) . Note gross revenues under list of movies .

Success finally came when he teamed up with film director John Woo in the 1986 gangster action-melodrama A Better Tomorrow, which swept the box offices in Asia and established Chow and Woo as megastars. A Better Tomorrow won him his first Best Actor award at the Hong Kong Film Awards. It was the highest-grossing film in Hong Kong history at the time, and set a new standard for Hong Kong gangster films. Taking the opportunity, Chow quit TV entirely. With his new image from A Better Tomorrow, he made many more 'gun fu' or 'heroic bloodshed' films, such as A Better Tomorrow II (1987), Prison on Fire (1987), Prison on Fire II (1991), The Killer (1989), A Better Tomorrow 3 (1990), Hard Boiled (1992) and City on Fire (1987), an inspiration for Quentin Tarantino's Reservoir Dogs.

Chow may be best known for playing honorable tough guys, whether cops or criminals, but he has also starred in comedies like Diary of a Big Man (1988) and Now You See Love, Now You Don't (1992) and romantic blockbusters such as Love in a Fallen City (1984) and An Autumn's Tale (1987), for which he was named Best Actor at the Golden Horse Awards. He brought together his disparate personae in the 1989 film God of Gamblers, directed by the prolific Wong Jing, in which he was by turns a suave charmer, a broad comedian, and an action hero. The film surprised many, became immensely popular, broke Hong Kong's all-time box office record, and spawned a series of gambling films as well as several comic sequels starring Andy Lau and Stephen Chow. The often tough demeanour and youthful appearance of Chow's characters has earned him the nickname "Babyface Killer".

The Los Angeles Times proclaimed Chow Yun-Fat "the coolest actor in the world". In the mid '90s, Chow moved to Hollywood in an ultimately unsuccessful attempt to duplicate his success in Asia. His first two films, The Replacement Killers (1998) and The Corruptor (1999), were box office failures. In his next film Anna and the King (1999), Chow teamed up with Jodie Foster, but the film underperformed at the box office. Chow accepted the role of Li Mu-bai in the (2000) film Crouching Tiger, Hidden Dragon. It became a winner at both the international box office and the Oscars. In 2003, Chow came back to Hollywood and starred in Bulletproof Monk. In 2004, Chow made a surprise cameo in director Dayyan Eng's Chinese rom-com favourite Waiting Alone, it was the first time he was in a mainland Chinese film. In 2006, he teamed up with Gong Li in the film Curse of the Golden Flower, directed by Zhang Yimou. 

In 2007, Chow played the pirate captain Sao Feng in Pirates of the Caribbean: At World's End. However, his part was omitted when the movie was shown in mainland China, where, according to Chinese unofficial sources, government censors felt that Chow's character "vilified and humiliated" Chinese people.

In the poorly received film Dragonball Evolution, Chow Yun-fat played Master Roshi.

In 2014, Chow returned to Hong Kong cinema in From Vegas to Macau. For the part, he lost 13 kg within 10 months.

In 2015 and 2016, Chow reprised his role as Ken in the sequels From Vegas to Macau II and From Vegas to Macau III.

In 2018, he co-starred with Aaron Kwok in Project Gutenberg which earned him another Best Actor nomination at the 38th Hong Kong Film Awards.

Book
On 26 June 2008, Chow released his first photo collection, which includes pictures taken on the sets of his films. Proceeds from the book's sales were donated to Sichuan earthquake victims. It is published by Louis Vuitton.

Personal life
Chow has been married twice; first was in 1983 to Candice Yu, an actress from Asia Television; the marriage lasted nine months. In 1986, Chow married Singaporean Jasmine Tan. They had a stillborn daughter in 1991. Chow has a goddaughter, Celine Ng, a former child model for Chickeeduck, McDonald's, Toys 'R' Us and other companies.

In 2014, Chow was the second-highest earning actor in Hong Kong, earning HK$170 million (US$21.9 million).  In 2018, Chow’s wife Jasmine Tan informed various Hong Kong media the figure HK$ 5.6b of Chow’s net worth, which was not verified by any third party. Chow also said he would donate 99% of his wealth to charity via setting up a foundation to help those in need. There have been no other reports on who controls the foundation and its ultimate beneficiaries.

Despite his wealth, Chow lives modestly. He is frequently seen at food stalls and on public transportation. In interviews, he has said he plans to leave his fortune to charity.

In October 2014, Chow voiced support for students in the Umbrella Movement, a civil rights movement for universal suffrage in Hong Kong.

Filmography

Chow has appeared in over 95 films and over 25 television series.

Awards and nominations
Hong Kong Film Awards
 Best Actor Nomination for Hong Kong 1941
 Best Actor Nomination for Women
 Best Supporting Actor Nomination for Love Unto Waste
 Best Actor for A Better Tomorrow
 Best Actor Nomination for Prison on Fire
 Best Actor Nomination for An Autumn's Tale
 Best Actor for City on Fire
 Best Original Film Song Nomination for The Diary of a Big Man
 Best Original Film Song Nomination for Triads: The Inside Story
 Best Actor Nomination for God of Gamblers
 Best Actor for All About Ah-Long
 Best Actor Nomination for Once a Thief
 Best Actor Nomination for Treasure Hunt
 Best Actor Nomination for Peace Hotel
 Best Actor Nomination for Crouching Tiger, Hidden Dragon
 Best Actor Nomination for Curse of the Golden Flower
 Best Supporting Actor Nomination for The Postmodern Life of My Aunt
 Best Actor Nomination for Project Gutenberg

(14 Best Actor nominations, two Best Supporting Actor nominations, two Best Original Film Song nominations)

Chinese American Film Festival

 Golden Angel for Best Actor in a Leading Role for Project Gutenberg (2019)

University honorary awards 
Hong Kong Academy for Performing Arts – Honorary Fellow (1999) 
City University of Hong Kong – Honorary Doctor of Letters (2001) 
Hong Kong Baptist University – Doctor of Humanities, honoris causa (2021)

See also

References

External links

 
 
 

1955 births
Living people
Hong Kong Buddhists
Hong Kong male film actors
Hong Kong male television actors
20th-century Hong Kong male actors
21st-century Hong Kong male actors
Indigenous inhabitants of the New Territories in Hong Kong
Recipients of the Silver Bauhinia Star